Copium is a genus of lace bugs in the family Tingidae.

Species
Twelve species are currently recognized:

 Copium adumbratum (Horváth, 1891)
 Copium bernardi Wagner, 1954
 Copium brevicorne (Jakovlev, 1880)
 Copium clavicorne (Linnaeus, 1758)
 Copium cornutum  (Shuruj, 1922)
 Copium horvathi Wagner, 1957
 Copium intermedium (Rey, 1888)
 Copium iranium Wagner, 1969
 Copium japonicum Esaki, 1931
 Copium magnicorne (Rey, 1888)
 Copium reyi Wagner, 1954
 Copium teucrii (Host, 1788)

References

Further reading

External links

 

Tingidae
Articles created by Qbugbot